Ileni Hagos (c. 1805 – 1851) was an important leader of the Tigrayans during the nineteenth century.

Ileni Hagos was married, but her husband died around 1837, and she began to defend the right of her son to rule. With the aid of an important military leader she was able to rule as regent, although there were those among her tribe who did not wish to see a woman in power. She imposed high taxes and began to fight with other local rulers, leading to a loss of popularity and, in 1841, deposition. She continued to play an important role in Tigrayan affairs until being tortured and murdered by an opponent. Her sons avenged her death, sparking a blood feud that ended only when her daughter married the nephew of her main adversary.

Ilene was a strong and dedicated woman to her family and to her peers. Although most of the history regarding Hagos, has yet to be documented, it is clear that she was a force to be reckoned with.

References

1805 births
1851 deaths
Eritrean women in politics
19th-century rulers in Africa
19th-century women rulers
Women rulers in Africa